Rabbi Moshe Reuven Azman (born in Leningrad on 13 March 1966) is an Orthodox rabbi who serves as the Chief Rabbi of Ukraine.

Rabbi Moshe Azman is an influential figure in Ukraine, an outspoken opponent of the Russian invasion of Ukraine in 2022, and a leader in international humanitarian aid efforts in Ukraine. He has been active on the international scene, raising awareness of the crisis in Ukraine, and strengthening Israel–Ukraine relations. He has met with top Israeli leaders including Prime Minister Benjamin Netanyahu and former Jerusalem mayor Nir Barkat.

Early life
Rabbi Azman was born in 1966 in Leningrad. Rabbi Azman's mother's family was Chabad and his father's family was Litvish. He is married to the daughter of Zusya Hirsh Lyubarsky, a shochet from Kharkiv. Rabbi Azman was active in the refusenik movement since his youth and received ordination as a shochet (ritual slaughterer) when he was 18. In 1982, the central communist newspaper Pravda, reporting on Jewish refusenik activities in Leningrad, referred to him as "An enemy of Soviet Power". In 1987, he received permission from the Soviet government to leave the USSR. He immigrated to Israel where he studied in a Chabad yeshiva. He worked as a secretary in "Beit Chabad for Russian Jews" in Israel during the Russian aliyah of 1991, helping Russian-Jewish immigrants adjust to Israel life in Israel and reconnect to Judaism. Rabbi Azman also helped with bringing Ukrainian-Jewish children of Chernobyl to Israel so that they could receive medical and psychological rehabilitation. 

In 1995, Rabbi Azman and his wife went to Kyiv and began a synagogue in one of the rooms of the grand Brodsky Choral Synagogue  which had been turned into a puppet theater during the Soviet period. There he helped to rebuild Kyiv's Jewish community. Eventually, the Kyiv government granted the entire synagogue to the Jewish community. 
Rabbi Azman went on to found a communal soup kitchen, a chevra kadisha (burial service), and a kindergarten through high school education system. In 2001, Rabbi Azman was awarded with the Badge of Honor by the Mayor of Kyiv, and in 2009 was awarded the Order of Merit by the Ukrainian government.

Career
In 2005, Rabbi Azman was appointed as Chief Rabbi of Ukraine by the All-Ukrainian Jewish Congress in 2005. Since his appointment, Rabbi Moshe Azman has led local Jewish community events, overseen the establishment of Jewish life infrastructure including kosher food, a chevra kadisha (burial service), education, and community relations with other international Jewish organizations. He maintains close relationships with many Ukrainian leaders throughout his career and frequently visits Israel.

He is known for his extensive humanitarian work within Ukraine.

Humanitarian Work

Rabbi Moshe Azman oversees the non-profit organization "Mitzvah for Ukraine" which provides humanitarian aid to Ukrainians of all genders, religions, and races. The organization operates two soup kitchens and distributes meal kits, oversees medical treatment, and has distributed aid shipments of clothing, generators, medical equipment, among others.

In 2022, Rabbi Moshe Azman organized the delivery of 16 air conditioner units to hospitals in Ukraine for use during the warm summer months.

Anatevka Refugee Village

In 2014, in response to the 2014 Russian invasion of Ukraine which displaced hundreds of thousands of people, Rabbi Azman established the Anatevka Refugee Village. The village provided housing, health care, food, and community support for hundreds of Jewish refugees. Soon after, the Mitzvah 613 Educational System was established which provided comprehensive education to both the children of Anatevka as well as Jews in other local communities. 

The Anatevka Refugee Village hosts a mikveh, a communal dining room, a kindergarten, a school, a soccer field, a playground, a woodworking workshop, a Cheder, a synagogue, and a hotel which is often used to house refugees before additional housing units are constructed.

2022 War Response

With the Russian Invasion of Ukraine in February 2022, Rabbi Azman and his organization took a prominent role in evacuating refugees. Reports say they were responsible for the evacuation of over 40,000 individuals. He has been a strong and outspoken opponent of the war, strongly condemning the Russian invasion. He told Newsweek: "I don't believe what I see. I see the Russians shooting civilian people. You make war crime, you are citizens of Russia. You are involved in the crime". He has had several viral videos in which he urged Ukrainians to resist Russian occupation. The video was seen by millions across social media and made him an icon in Ukraine.

His organization has overseen extensive aid distribution including food, clothing, medical aid, water, medical equipment, and generators. During the beginning of November, Rabbi Azman coordinated with the humanitarian organization Yad Sarah to arrange shipments of surplus medical supplies to be distributed in Ukraine.

Kherson Humanitarian Crisis
In response to the liberation of Kherson on November 11, 2022, by Ukrainian forces, Rabbi Azman and his organization provided extensive emergency aid to the residents of the city. As Russian troops withdrew from the city, they destroyed key buildings, cut power lines, disabled the local water treatment plants and power generators, and planted explosives and landmines in key transit areas. Furthermore, they ensured that virtually no food remained in the city – stealing what they could and burning the rest. Rabbi Azman organized aid shipments and distributions to the city.

International Relations
Rabbi Azman has dedicated himself to strengthening Israel-Ukraine relations. Rabbi Azman has met several times with Prime Minister Benjamin Netanyahu to discuss the humanitarian crisis in Ukraine. Rabbi Azman also received MK Nir Barkat in Ukraine. Nir Barkat was the first Israeli politician to visit Ukraine since the beginning of the war. On October 28, 2022, Rabbi Azman hosted an event in collaboration with The Friends of Zion Museum. Attending were Benjamin Netanyahu, Nir Barkat, the Kosovan Ambassador to Israel and the Slovakian Ambassadors to Israel.

References

1966 births
Living people
Religious leaders from Kyiv
Ukrainian Orthodox rabbis
Ukraine
21st-century Ukrainian rabbis
20th-century Ukrainian rabbis